"You're Only Lonely" is a 1979 single by J. D. Souther from his album of the same name. The single peaked at number seven on the Billboard Hot 100, Souther's only top ten pop hit, and spent five weeks at number one on the Adult Contemporary chart.

Background
Souther hired Danny Kortchmar to play guitar, David Sanborn saxophone, and to help out with the harmony, Phil Everly, Jackson Browne, and three members of the Eagles  (Frey, Felder, Henley).

Charts

Cover versions
The song was covered in 2004 by Taiwanese girl group S.H.E in their album Magical Journey. 
It was covered by singer-songwriter Schuyler Fisk on her album The Good Stuff.   
Patrick Norman covered the song to Québec in French as "Tout au long de ma vie" with his clear smooth voice.
Also covered by Raul Malo of The Mavericks, on his 2006 album "You're Only Lonely"

Popular culture
It is also featured in the 2005 Korean film, Daddy-Long-Legs and the 2013 Korean drama, Give Love Away.

See also
List of number-one adult contemporary singles of 1979 (U.S.)

References

1979 singles
J. D. Souther songs
Songs written by J. D. Souther
1979 songs
Columbia Records singles